The Venezuelan Federation of Chambers of Commerce and Production (Spanish: Federación de Cámaras y Asociaciones de Comercio y Producción de Venezuela) or Fedecámaras is Venezuela's main business union. It is formed by businesses that represent all economic sectors of the country.

Fedecámaras is composed of chambers of commerce (cámara in Spanish) in fourteen basic trade groups: banking, agriculture, commerce, construction, energy, manufacturing, media, mining, ranching, insurance, transportation, tourism, real estate and telecommunications. Additionally, 18 regional Fedecámaras chapters complete the organisation. Fedecámaras represents small, medium and large-size companies.

In practice, the intended function of Fedecámaras is to act as a cartel controlling these sectors of the Venezuelan economy, setting wages and working conditions within each respective trade. Fedecámaras enforces these conditions by several means, including strikes against their aggregate employees to enforce wages and conditions. The cámaras also seek to informally control the amount of competition they will allow into each trade by controlling membership, and the rights enjoyed by members.

This organization was at political odds with former Venezuelan President Hugo Chávez. During a failed coup d'état against him in April 2002, former Fedecámaras president Pedro Carmona assumed the role of interim de facto president of Venezuela for two days.

Background
Founded in 1944, Fedecámaras was formed with the main objective of protecting the free enterprise, by promoting the development and diversification of the country within a regulatory system that guarantees the rights of all individuals, and by defending its members and affiliates.

President and leadership
The current leadership for the 2021-2023 period is the following: Carlos Fernández Gallardo is the president; Adán Celis Michelena is the first vice-president, Felipe Capozzolo is the second vice-president, and César Augusto Guillén Lamus is the treasurer.

List of past presidents Fedecámaras:

See also
 Venezuelan coup attempt of 2002

References

External links
 Official site
 :es:Fedecámaras (Venezuela)
 http://www.fedecamaras.org.ve/quienes-somos/directiva/

Business organizations based in Venezuela
Employers' organizations
Chambers of commerce
Economy of Venezuela